Acontia nivipicta is a moth of the family Noctuidae. It is found in the northern two thirds of Australia.

The wingspan is about 20 mm.

References

nivipicta
Moths of Australia
Moths described in 1886